Below are the squads for the 2004 South Asian Games, hosted by Islamabad, Pakistan, which took place between the March 28 and April 5, 2004.

Group A

Pakistan U23

GK: 
Jaffar Khan (Army) D.O.B: 20 March 1981
Muhammad Shahzad (Habib Bank) D.O.B: 25 August 1983
DF: 
Muhammad Naveed Akram (WAPDA) D.O.B: 16.05.1984 
Muhammad Sharif (Army) D.O.B: 20.04.1981
Arif Ali (Balochistan) D.O.B: 04.03.1986 
Ejaz Ahmed (Army) D.O.B: 1984
Mehmood Khan (Balochistan),
Muhammad Zahid (Army) D.O.B: 10.10.1981
MF: 
Nasir Iqbal (Army) D.O.B: 15.06.1982 
Zahid Hameed (PTCL) 01.08.1985
Burhan Ali (PTCL) 25.10.1984
Attique-ur-Rehman (KRL) 05.05.1984
Imran Niazi (WAPDA) 17.11.1985
Arif Mehmood (WAPDA) 09.11.1981
Qamar Zaman (WAPDA) 15.01.1986
FW: 
Adeel Ahmed (PTCL) 25.11.1983
Muhammad Essa (PTCL) 20.11.1983
Shahid Ahmed (PTCL) 01.03.1983
Mudassar Saeed (KRL) 03.07.1981
Abdul Aziz (Sindh Govt Press) 11.01.1986
Farooq Shah (SSGC) 19.10.1985

Afghanistan U23

Abadullah Barak
Abaseen Atai
Abdul Ahmad Tanhah
Abdul Tawab Sultani
Ahmadullah Ahmadi
Farid Ahmadi
Hadi Razai
Mohammad Aslam Askaryar
Mohammad Haneef Jabar Khil
Mohammad Khalid Dilwar
Mohammad Nasim Hussaini
Nangialai Sayedi
Qasim Ali Rahimi
Rahman Ali Nazari
Raza Mohammadi
Raza Razai
Rozeddin Omidwar
Syed Hameed
Shams Uddin Amiri 
Wahidullah Nazari

Bangladesh U23

Masud Parvez
Rashed Ahmed
Ashraful Kader
Abdullah Al Parvez
Aminul Islam
Mehedi Hasan Ujjal
Mustafa Anwar Parvez Babu
Firoj Mahmud Titu
Zahid Hasan Ameli
Mohammed Monwar Hossain
Mohammed Sujan
Ziaur Rahman
Atiqul Islam Tariq
Ashraful Karim
Arman Aziz
Kamal Hossain
AKM Harisuzzaman
Zahidul Hasan Dalim 
Yousuf Ali Khan
Akram Hossain

India U20

GK:
Subhasish Roy Chowdhury (Tata Football Academy)
Machindra Singh (Punjab)
Amit Nandy (Bengal) 
DF:
Habibur Rehman Mondal (Tata Football Academy)
Gurpreet Singh (Tata Football Academy)
Warundeep Singh (Tata Football Academy)
Subhas Mondal (Tata Football Academy)
N. S. Manju (DYS, Karnataka)
MF:
Gouramangi Singh (Tata Football Academy)
Malswama (Tata Football Academy)
Jerry Zirsanga (Tata Football Academy)
Debabrata Roy (Tata Football Academy)
Chitrasen Chandam Singh (Tata Football Academy)
Shylo Malsawmtluanga (East Bengal)
Naduparambil Pappachan Pradeep (Kerala)
FW:
Vimal Pariyar (Tata Football Academy)
Vanlal Rova (Tata Football Academy)
Sunil Chhetri (Mohun Bagan)
Sutang Marlanki (Fransa FC, Goa)
Sampath Kuttymani (Indian Telephone Industries)

Group B

Bhutan U23

Chencho Gyeltshen
Dorji Khandu
Gyeltshen
Singye Jigme
Kinley Dorji
Subba Krishna
Kunzang Wangchuk
Nawang Dhendup
Passang Tshering
Pema Chophel
Pema Dorji
Sangay Khandu
Sonam Tenzin
Tashi Dorji
Tashi Jamtsho
Ugyen Dorji
Wangchuck

Nepal U23

GK: 
Dillip Chhetri (RCT)
Bikash Malla (Friends Club/ANFA Academy U-20)
Ritesh Thapa (Three Star Club)
DF: 
Sagar Thapa (Sankata)
Pralya Rajbhandari (Friends Club/ANFA Academy U-20)
Umesh Upreti (Manang Marsyangdi Club)
Janak Singh (Three Star Club), 
Anjan K.C. (Friends Club/ANFA Academy U-20)
Sanjeev Budathoki (Mahendra Police Club)
Santosh Shrestha (Waling)
MF: 
Bijaya Gurung (Friends Club/ANFA Academy U-20)
Pradeep Dangol (Friends Club/ANFA Academy U-20) 
Prabesh Katuwal (Friends Club)
Raju Katuwal (Mahendra Police Club) 
Vishan Gauchan (Friends Club)
Naveen Neupane (Manang Marsyangdi Club)
FW: 
Raj Kumar Ghising (Sankata U-17)
Jibesh Pandey (Sankata),
Prabin Manandhar (Friends Club/ANFA Academy U-20)

See also
South Asian Games
Football at the South Asian Games

References

2004 South Asian Games
2004 South Asian Games
South Asian Games football squads